South Kortright is a hamlet in Delaware County, New York, United States.

South Kortright has the ZIP code 13842. The post office was closed in 2009 and mail functions were transferred to the nearby village of Hobart.

South Kortright Central School District, established in 1940, enrolls students from the hamlet as well as the neighboring village of Hobart and the hamlet of Bloomville. The average age of residence in the hamlet is 51.7 years.

Notable person
Anna Moschovakis, writer and translator

References

Hamlets in Delaware County, New York
Hamlets in New York (state)